Grigorios Maraslis (25 July 1831 – 1 May 1907) was an official of the Russian Empire and long-time mayor of Odesa (1878–1895) of Greek origin. A noted philanthropist, he sponsored many buildings and educational institutions both in Odesa and in various cities in Greece and for the Greek communities of the Ottoman Empire. He was awarded Order of the Cross of Takovo and Order of Prince Danilo I.

See also 
 Maraslis House, in Odesa
 Odesa Fine Arts Museum, donated by Maraslis
 Main building of the Athens University of Economics and Business, funded by Maraslis

References

1831 births
1907 deaths
19th-century Greek people
19th-century people from the Russian Empire
Mayors of Odesa
Russian philanthropists
People from the Russian Empire of Greek descent
Recipients of the Order of St. Anna, 1st class
Recipients of the Order of St. Vladimir, 2nd class
Greek philanthropists
Privy Councillor (Russian Empire)
Politicians from Odesa